Arthur de Carle Sowerby (8 July 1885 – 16 August 1954) was a British naturalist, explorer, writer, and publisher in China. His father was Arthur Sowerby (15 October 1857 – 27 June 1934).

Background
Arthur Sowerby was the son of a Christian missionary in China, the Reverend Arthur Sowerby, and Louisa Clayton. He was also the great-great-grandson of James Sowerby the botanist and founder of the Geological Society. From 1881, Arthur's parents were based at the Baptist Missionary Society mission station in Shanxi. The Sowerby family was on furlough in England at the time of the 1900 Boxer Rebellion during which many of their friends and colleagues at their Shanxi mission station were massacred.

Education
Sowerby attended Bristol University studying for a BSc in Science but dropped out and returned to China where he was appointed lecturer and curator of the Anglo-Chinese College in Tientsin.

Expeditions
Sowerby joined the Duke of Bedford’s 1906 Mission to collect zoological specimens in Shensi for the British Museum during which time he discovered a new species of Jerboa which was subsequently named after him: Dipus sagitta sowerby.

Sowerby was taken on as a naturalist for Robert Sterling Clark's Expedition of 1909 which sought specimens from the Yellow River into Shensi and then to Kansu province and made the first map of a little-known area of China. Clarke and Sowerby later published a book about the expedition entitled  Through Shên-kan: the account of the Clark expedition in north China, 1908-9. Sowerby married Mary Ann Mesny in 1909, but she was to die just 5 years later.

He made four separate expeditions into Manchuria and parts of Mongolia during the next few years, the last being in 1915 and then wrote his book Fur and Feather in North China. In the autumn of 1915 he went over to meet his brother and sister, both missionaries in Sian, and took the opportunity to seek more specimens in the Ch'ingling range to the south of the city.

Shaanxi Relief
During the Xinhai Revolution, Arthur headed up the Shaanxi (Shensi) Relief Expedition.  The expedition's task was to rescue and lead to safety as many foreign missionaries as possible. Setting out in December 1911 they trekked to Xi'an where the whole area was in a state of political upheaval following the overthrow of the dynasty. Bandit hordes were rampaging and had taken over much of the countryside. After a number of hair-raising experiences they returned to the safety of Peking in early 1912.

First World War
Sowerby returned to England during the First World War with the intention of joining up, but to his dismay was posted to the Chinese Labour Corps (CLC) due to his ability to speak the language.  He was demobilised in 1919, remaining in England for a further year while writing The Naturalist in Manchuria.

The China Journal
By the early part of the 1920s, Sowerby found that his chronic arthritis was preventing him from making any more major expeditions and therefore, when he met and married Clarice Moise in 1922, during her stay in Shanghai on her world tour, they settled in Shanghai where they decided to found the China Journal which they edited until 1938, with Sowerby making regular contributions and editorials.

Second World War
After the Japanese capture of Shanghai's International Settlement on 8 December 1941, Sowerby, along with thousands of Allied nationals, lived under the Japanese occupation.  Early on the morning of 5 November 1942 he was arrested, along with some 350 other prominent or suspicious individuals, by the Japanese kempeitai. However, due to ill health, he was released later that day, while the others began an almost three year internment in the Haiphong Road Camp. In June 1944 the Japanese revoked all previous exemptions from internment due to medical grounds and Sowerby was interned in the Lincoln Avenue Camp at the end of the month. While in camp, he taught botany and zoology to internees.

Other interests
Sowerby was a Fellow of the Royal Geographical Society, a Fellow of the Zoological Society, a member and President (1935-1940) of the North China Branch of the Royal Asiatic Society  and also President (1928) of the China Society of Science and Arts (in Shanghai), as well as being Honorary Director of the Shanghai Museum.

Death
Sowerby and his third wife Alice retired to Washington, D.C. in the United States where Arthur died in 1954.

Legacy
Sowerby was commemorated in the scientific name of a species of Chinese lizard, Lygosaurus sowerbyi, which was described and named by Leonhard Stejneger of the Smithsonian Institution in 1924. As of 2020 the species is considered to be a synonym of Ateuchosaurus chinensis.

Publications
 Nature in Chinese Art, HE Gibson, 1940 – The John Day Company
 Clay Funerary Figurines of the Pre-Han Period in China, 1954 – Hong Kong University Press
 Notes on the Original Habitat of Father David's Deer, 1949 – Université l'Aurore
 A Review of the Mammals of the Japanese Islands, Possessions and Mandated Territories, – Université l'Auroore
 A New Species of Shrew from the Shanghai Area, 1945 – Université l'Aurore
 Amphibians and Reptiles Recorded from Or Known to Occur in the Shanghai Area, M Heude, 1943 – Université l'Aurore
 Birds Recorded from Or Known to Occur in the Shanghai Area, 1943 – Université l'Aurore
 The mammals of the Japanese Islands, a. de Carle Sowerby, 1943 – Universite L'Aurore
 Nature in Chinese art, 1940 – The John Day Company New York
 A naturalist's note-book in China, 1925 – Shanghai: North-China Daily News
 A Naturalist's Holiday by the Sea, 1923 - London: George Routledge & Sons
 On a New Bat from Manchuria, Journal of Mammalogy, 1922
 Notes on Heude's Bears in the Sikawei Museum, and on the Bears of Palaearctic Eastern Asia, 1920 – Journal of Mammalogy

See also
Sowerby family
List of famous big game hunters

References

External links
 Arthur de Carle Sowerby correspondence in the Sterling and Francine Clark Papers, Correspondence, Archives, Sterling and Francine Clark Art Institute
Arthur de Carle Sowerby Papers at the Smithsonian Institution Archives. Includes a biography.

1885 births
1954 deaths
British explorers
British naturalists
Explorers of Asia
British non-fiction writers
British editors
British male writers
20th-century naturalists
20th-century non-fiction writers
Male non-fiction writers